Begović is a Bosnian surname, derived from the Ottoman Turkish word bey (beg in Bosnian) meaning "chieftain" or "lord". It is borne by ethnic Bosniaks, Serbs and Croats. Its literal meaning is "chieftain's son". It may refer to:

Asmir Begović (b. 1987), Bosnian footballer 
Boris Begović (b. 1956), Serbian economist 
Ena Begović (1960–2000), Croatian actress 
Enes Begović (b. 1965), Bosnian singer-songwriter and producer 
Ivo Begović (b. 1993), Croatian water polo player 
Jelena Begović (b. 1970), Serbian molecular biologist 
Mia Begović (b. 1963), Croatian actress 
Milan Begović (1876–1948), Croatian writer 
Miljan Begović (b. 1964), Croatian figure skater 
Nenad Begović (b. 1980), Serbian footballer 
Nikola Begović (1821-1895), Serbian priest, religious teacher, poet and historian 
Vinko Begović (b. 1948), Croatian football coach

Fictional 

 Đuka Begović, protagonist in eponymous book by Ivan Kozarac and film by Branko Schmidt

See also
Begić
Begovich, anglicized version
Begovići
Begović Kula

Bosnian surnames
Croatian surnames
Serbian surnames